Chicago Poodle (シカゴプードル) is a Japanese three-piece piano band under the Giza Studio label.

Biography

In April, 2000 the band has formed in Doshisha University
In October, 2003 they've won a grand prix at Kyoto Festin in Country-Wide Student Music Contest
In July, 2004 they've made debut with mini album White mini album in the indies label Tent House
In August, 2006 Sugioka has left band and only three members remained in band
Since 2008 they regularly broadcast in FM Tokushima their own radio program Chicago Poodle no Radio Kaze
On March 8, 2009 they've made major debut with single Odyssey in the label Giza Studio by distributors Being Inc.
On December 1, 2010, the band has participated in Christmas cover album "Christmas Non-Stop Carol" along with other Giza and Tent House artists.
In 2011, they did their first hole one man live Inu (one) Fes 2011 in Osaka ~Bokura wo Tsunagumono~
In 2012, vocalist Kouta established his secret jazz solo project Ssllee with digital song Midousuji wo Arukou (御堂筋を歩こう) under D-Go Records. The activity after has been unknown. 
In 2013, they've released first anime theme song which was used for television series Detective Conan
In 2017, they've released fifth studio album Sodefuri Au mo Tashou no En
On November 11, 2018, they've released 7th digital single Wonderful Days. Even though the song havs the cheerful melody, it was composed for vocalist Kouta's dog which passed away during year 2018.

Members
The band consist currently of three members:
Kouta Hanazawa (花沢耕太) - vocalist, composer, pianist
Norihito Yamaguchi (山口教仁) - drummer, lyricist
Kenji Tsujimoto (辻本健司) - bassist, lyricist

Former Members
Hidenori Sugioka (杉岡秀則)- former bassist, lyricist, left band in 2006
Naoya Harada (原田直弥) - former keyboardist, lyricist, left band in 2002

Major label discography 
So far they've released 7 singles, 4 albums and 1 best album.

Singles

Digital singles

Albums

Indies

Singles

Albums

Mini albums

Magazine appearances

From Music Freak Magazine:
2005 January Vol.122
2006 February Vol.135
2006 April Vol.137
2006 November Vol.144
2007 May Vol.149
2007 August Vol.152
2007 November Vol.155
2008 March Vol.159
2008 May Vol.161
2008 June Vol.162
2009 February Vol.170
2009 March Vol.171
2009 April Vol.172
2009 May Vol.173
2009 June Vol.174
2009 July Vol.175
2009 August Vol.176
2009 September Vol.177
2009 November Vol.179

From Music freak magazine ES:
March 2010 Vol.3
September 2010 Vol.9
December 2010 Vol.12
January 2011 Vol.13
February 2011 Vol.14
March 2011 Vol.15
April 2011 Vol.16
May 2011 Vol.17
June 2011 Vol.18
July 2011 Vol.19
August 2011 Vol.20
September 2011 Vol.21
October 2011 Vol.22
November 2011 Vol.23
December 2011 Vol.24
January 2012 Vol.25
February 2012 Vol.26
March 2012 Vol.27
April 2012 Vol.28
May 2012 Vol.29
June 2012 Vol.30
July 2012 Vol.31
August 2012 Vol.32
September 2012 Vol.33
October 2012 Vol.34
November 2012 Vol.35
December 2012 Vol.36
April 2013 Vol.40
May 2013 Vol.41
July 2013 Vol.43
August 2013 Vol.44
January 2014 Vol.49
July 2014 Vol.55
September 2014 Vol.57
February 2015 Vol.62
May 2015 Vol.65

Interview

From Natasha Inc.:
Chicago Poodle 2009 "Boku Tabi"
Chicago Poodle 2011 "Sakurairo"
Chicago Poodle 2011 "History I"
Chicago Poodle 2013 "3.0"
Chicago Poodle 2013 "Takaramono/Kimi no Egao ga Nani yori Suki datta"
Chicago Poodle 2014 "Scenario no Nai Life"

From Barks:
Chicago Poodle 2013 "Takaramono/Kimi no Egao ga Nani yori Suki datta"
Chicago Poodle 2014 "Scenario no Nai Life"
Chicago Poodle 2014 "Life Is Beautiful"

From Billboard Japan:
Chicago Poodle 2011 "History I"
Chicago Poodle 2013 "Takaramono/Kimi no Egao ga Nani yori Suki datta"
Chicago Poodle 2014 "Scenario no Nai Life"
Chicago Poodle 2014 "Life Is Beautiful"

From Okmusic:
Okmusic UP's vol.73
Okmusic UP's vol.78
Okmusic UP's vol.87
Okmusic UP's vol.104
Okmusic UP's vol.108
Okmusic UP's vol.113
Okmusic UP's vol.121
Okmusic UP's vol.156

From Mfound:
Chicago Poodle 2014 "Scenario no Nai Life"

From Keyboard Magazine:
Chicago Poodle 2014 "Life Is Beautiful"

From Hot Express Music Magazine:
Chicago Poodle 2009 "Sayonara Baby"
Chicago Poodle 2009 "Boku Tabi"
Chicago Poodle 2011 "History I"

From Skream:
Chicago Poodle 2009/10
Chicago Poodle 2009 "Oddysey"
Chicago Poodle 2010/5

References

External links 
Official major website 
Official indies website (WebArchive) 
Official Facebook page 
Official Twitter profile 
Official blog 
Profile in Beinggiza 

Being Inc. artists
Musicians from Kyoto
Japanese rock music groups
Japanese pop music groups
Anime musicians